The 1989–90 NBA season was the Warriors' 44th season in the National Basketball Association, and 27th in the San Francisco Bay Area. With the 14th pick in the 1989 NBA draft, the Warriors selected Tim Hardaway from the University of Texas-El Paso. Hardaway teamed with All-Star forward Chris Mullin, and second-year star Mitch Richmond to form the threesome later known as Run TMC. The Warriors got off to a bad start losing 14 of their first 18 games, but posted two six-game winning streaks afterwards winning 12 of their next 15 games, and held a 23–24 record at the All-Star break. At midseason, the team traded Winston Garland to the Los Angeles Clippers. However, midway through the season, they struggled and fell below .500, missing the playoffs by finishing fifth in the Pacific Division with a 37–45 record.

Mullin averaged 25.1 points, 5.9 rebounds and 1.6 steals per game, and was named to the All-NBA Third Team, and was selected for the 1990 NBA All-Star Game. In addition, Richmond averaged 22.1 points per game, while Terry Teagle provided the team with 16.1 points per game, and Hardaway contributed 14.7 points, 8.7 assists and 2.1 steals per game, and was named to the NBA All-Rookie First Team. Rookie guard Sarunas Marciulionis contributed 12.1 points per game off the bench, while Rod Higgins provided with 11.1 points and 5.1 rebounds per game, and Manute Bol led the team with 3.2 blocks per game.

In a 120–115 road win over the Boston Celtics on January 21, 1990, Hardaway, Mullin and Richmond all surpassed 20 points in the same game for the first time. The Warriors also led the NBA in scoring during the season. Following the season, Teagle was traded to the Los Angeles Lakers, and Bol was dealt to the Philadelphia 76ers.

For the season, the Warriors changed their uniforms, which remained in use until 1997.

Draft picks

Roster

Regular season

Season standings

z - clinched division title
y - clinched division title
x - clinched playoff spot

Record vs. opponents

Game log

Player statistics

Awards and records
 Chris Mullin, NBA All-Star Game
 Chris Mullin, All-NBA Third Team
 Tim Hardaway, NBA All-Rookie Team 1st Team

Transactions
 June 15, 1989: Otis Smith drafted in the NBA expansion draft by the Orlando Magic.
 June 16, 1989: Released Orlando Graham.
 June 16, 1989: Released Ben McDonald.
 June 16, 1989: Released John Starks.
 June 23, 1989: Signed Sarunas Marciulionis as a free agent.
 June 27, 1989: Traded a 1989 1st round draft pick to the Seattle SuperSonics for a 1990 1st round draft pick.
 July 5, 1989: Released Steve Alford.
 July 11, 1989: Larry Smith signed as an unrestricted free agent with the Houston Rockets.
 August 7, 1989: Traded a 1990 1st round draft pick to the Seattle SuperSonics for Alton Lister.
 August 10, 1989: Signed Leonard Taylor as a free agent.
 September 22, 1989: Signed Uwe Blab as an unrestricted free agent.
 September 27, 1989: Traded Ralph Sampson to the Sacramento Kings for Jim Petersen.
 October 2, 1989: Traded Tellis Frank to the Miami Heat for a 1990 2nd round draft pick.
 October 5, 1989: Signed Tom Tolbert as a free agent.
 October 5, 1989: Steve Alford signed as an unrestricted free agent with the Dallas Mavericks.
 October 7, 1989: Signed Marques Johnson as an unrestricted free agent.
 November 2, 1989: Waived Tom Tolbert.
 November 9, 1989: Signed Tom Tolbert as a free agent.
 November 29, 1989: Waived Marques Johnson.
 December 4, 1989: Signed John Shasky as a free agent.
 December 12, 1989: Waived Leonard Taylor.
 February 22, 1990: Traded Uwe Blab to the San Antonio Spurs for Chris Welp.
 February 22, 1990: Traded Winston Garland to the Los Angeles Clippers for a 1990 2nd round draft pick and a 1992 2nd round draft pick.
 February 27, 1990: Signed Mike Smrek to a contract for the rest of the season.
 February 27, 1990: Waived John Shasky.
 February 28, 1990: Signed Kelvin Upshaw to a contract for the rest of the season.

Player Transactions Citation:

References

See also
 1989-90 NBA season

Golden State Warriors seasons
Golden
Golden
Golden State